Kamakalawa is a 1981 Filipino fantasy film written, produced and directed by Eddie Romero and starred Christopher De Leon, Tetchie Agbayani and Chat Silayan. The film explores the folklore of prehistoric Philippines.

The film is the last entry in Eddie Romero's epic historical film trilogy after "Ganito Kami Noon, Paano Kayo Ngayon?" and "Aguila", respectively.

Cast
Christopher De Leon as Kauing
Tetchie Agbayani as Agos
Chat Silayan as Amihan
Raoul Aragonn as Dumagit
Apeng Daldal as Olap
Ruben Rustia as Kalai
Jimmy Santos as Tuktok
Yasmin Ayesa as Sibul
Greg Lozano as Ulaya
Johnny Vicar as Suhay
Angelo Ventura as Pulo
Joey Romero as Luok
Gil Arceo as Ugau
Boy Ybañez as Luok's Lieutenant
Vic Santos as Luok's Lieutenant
Arthur Cervantes as Luok's Lieutenant
Nilda Magdamo as Kauing's Mother
Lemuel Torrevillas as Kauing's Brother
Rowena Tiempo Torrevillas as Kauing's Sister-in-Law
Meg Doromal as Kauing's First Sister
Fely Salve as Kauing's Second Sister
Gil Bergado as Kauing's Father
Marietta de la Cruz as Lead Amazon
Ruby Mesina as Lead Amazon
Noel Gallego as Lead Vampire
Danny Bustamante as Lead Vampire
George Hilario as Lead Elf
Ricky Dumigpi as Lead Elf
Eddie Sta. Maria as Lead Elf

See also 
 Aguila (film)
 Ganito Kami Noon, Paano Kayo Ngayon?

References

External links
 

1981 films
Philippine fantasy films
Tagalog-language films
1981 fantasy films
Films directed by Eddie Romero